Sangertown Square is a shopping mall located in New Hartford, New York between New York State Route 5 and New York State Route 8 near Utica, New York. Sangertown Square is a single-story mall, and comprises  of leasable retail space. The mall was built in 1980 and has a central food court and 50 stores. The mall is anchored by the traditional retailers Boscov's, Dick's Sporting Goods, HomeGoods, and Target while featuring the prominent specialty retailers American Eagle, Bath and Body Works, Charlotte Russe, Hollister, and Victoria's Secret.

History 
The mall opened in 1980 with Hess's, JCPenney, Sears, and Bradlees. Storied regional division Hess's became Pittsburgh, Pennsylvania-based Kaufmann's in 1994. Bradlees shuttered in around 2001 which was razed and replaced with a Target store during most of 2002. Kaufmann's transitioned into a Macy's in September 2006.

The mall featured a 9-screen movie theater operated by Hoyts Cinema until the theater closed in 2004. 

In 2009, Circuit City shuttered becoming a HomeGoods.

In September 2012, DSW opened as a junior anchor within the shopping concourse.

In 2014, a two-year refresh modernizing Sangertown Square was announced which includes new seating, decorative lighting, new tile, exterior entrances, and an improved landscape.

In 2015, it was announced Boscov's will replace Sears which would then shutter as part of an ongoing decision to phase out of their traditional brick-and-mortar divisions.

The early 2020's saw several storied traditional department store retailers update its brick-and-mortar divisions after being disrupted by several digital retailers in recent years.

On June 4, 2020, JCPenney announced that as part of modernizing their traditional brick-and-mortar retail base that they'll no longer continue to position an outpost in this retail environment.

On January 6, 2021, Macy's, which maintains several much larger outposts next to Albany and Syracuse, announced that as part of a strategy to focus on their highest achieving locations that they would be leaving this regional shopping center.

Several potential replacement tenants for each space are each reportedly in the midst of early on discussions. By October 2022, after the early on COVID-19 shut down, Sangertown  Square had announced several newest additions, its fine jewelery traditional retailer Ashcroft & Oak, bohemian clothing store retailer Earthbound Trading Co., Journeys, Blue Sox Academy, and axe throwing at PiNZ social.

References

External links

Pyramid Companies page on Sangertown Square

Shopping malls in New York (state)
The Pyramid Companies
Shopping malls established in 1980